Cell is a 2016 American science fiction horror film based on the 2006 novel of the same name by Stephen King. The film is directed by Tod Williams, produced by John Cusack, with a screenplay by King and Adam Alleca. The film stars John Cusack, Samuel L. Jackson, and Isabelle Fuhrman. The film was released on June 10, 2016 to video on demand, prior to a limited release scheduled for July 8, 2016. Cell is the second film adaptation of a King story to co-star Cusack and Jackson, after the 2007 film 1408. The film's story follows a New England artist struggling to reunite with his young son after a mysterious signal broadcast over the global cell phone network turns the majority of his fellow humans into mindless vicious animals.

The film received negative reviews from critics upon its release for being poorly crafted and lacking suspense.

Plot
Clay Riddell is a disillusioned artist, who a year earlier abandoned his wife Sharon and son Johnny in order to fulfill his dream of publishing a graphic novel. At Boston International Airport, Clay tries to board a flight, hoping to reconcile with his family. His cell phone battery dies, so he calls Sharon using a payphone. Suddenly an electronic signal (later dubbed "the pulse") is broadcast across mobile networks worldwide, turning cell phone users into rabid killers. Clay escapes the chaos in the terminal and meets a group of survivors in a subway car. The train's conductor, Tom McCourt, suggests abandoning the train and traveling through the tunnels, since power has been cut to the subway trains and the pumps keeping the tunnels dry will soon shut down with no one manning them. Clay agrees and, joined by a third man, attempts to escape the airport.

Near the tunnel's exit, their companion is slaughtered by an infected man, later dubbed a "phoner", and the two escape to the street above. Clay leads Tom to his apartment. That night, they are joined by Alice Maxwell, a teenage neighbor of Clay's who killed her mother in self-defense. All three decide to escape Boston. Heading north through New England to find Sharon and Johnny, the three acquire weapons from a house and are chased by a flock of phoners to a nearby river. Hiding from the infected, they observe the flock emitting mysterious signals from their mouths and then walking off as a group.

After sundown the three arrive at a private school, where they meet two survivors: headmaster Charles Ardai and a student named Jordan. Charles postulates that the phoners have developed a hive mind and are telepathic. He shows them thousands of phoners lying inert in the school's athletic field. Charles has a plan to use the stadium's gas pumps and a sprayer truck to burn the phoners, and the others agree to help. Clay and Tom drive over the phoners, spraying them with gasoline, which Charles sets ablaze. The fire spreads, causing an explosion that kills Charles. The remaining group, now including Jordan, continue north.

Taking shelter at an abandoned drive-in theater, the four go to sleep, and all of them dream about a raggedy-looking man in a red hoodie, a character from Clay's graphic novel. Later they encounter a group of survivors in a roadside bar. They tell the four about Kashwak, a state park in Maine where there is said to be no cell service. After agreeing to travel there, they spend the night in the bar. Sally, one of the survivors, is awoken and infected by a group outside. She can now transmit the pulse through her mouth. The group attacks Tom and Jordan. After saving Tom from a phoner, Alice is bludgeoned in the head by Sally, whom Tom fatally shoots. The group takes Alice outside, where she succumbs to her head wound.

Later, the group encounter a sleepless Ray Huizenga and his friend Denise, who say that Kashwak is a trap set by the Raggedy Man. Ray becomes increasingly agitated, muttering that the Raggedy Man is planting thoughts in his head. He gives Clay his cell phone and tells him to call the number on it when they reach the end of the road. Ray then kills himself with a bomb around his neck. In Ray's truck, the group discovers a huge quantity of C-4 explosives. When the group makes it to Sharon's house, Clay learns that Johnny has headed for Kashwak and that Sharon has turned into a phoner. After killing her, Clay drives alone to Kashwak, intent on locating Johnny, while the others continue north, leaving marks as a trail for Clay.

At Kashawk, Clay finds thousands of phoners walking in an enormous circle around a communications tower. Clay sees the Raggedy Man at the center of the circle, runs him over and repeatedly shoots him. Then Clay hears his son calling to him from amongst the flock and escapes from the circle. An infected Johnny appears before him and the Raggedy Man returns to life. Clay hugs his son as he calls the number on Ray's phone, detonating the explosives in the truck, destroying the tower and the phoners. Clay and his son find the marks and follow the trail toward Clay's friends. However, the explosion is revealed to be an illusion: Clay has been infected and is now walking in the circle around the tower.

Cast

Production

Development
The film is based on the 2006 novel of the same name by Stephen King. Dimension Films announced in March 2006 that Eli Roth would direct the project after finishing Hostel: Part II. Roth exited the project in 2009, saying:

Following Roth's departure, Screen Rant noted that the film "faded into the background". However, in October 2012, John Cusack was announced as the first actor to join the film, followed by the selection of Tod Williams as director in early 2013. In November 2013, Samuel L. Jackson was cast as Tom McCourt. Isabelle Fuhrman was announced as Alice on February 5, 2014, and Stacy Keach was cast in an unnamed role of a headmaster the following day. The film was shot over 25 days in January 2014 in Atlanta, Georgia.

Release
In February 2015, the producers of the film announced that Clarius Entertainment had acquired distribution rights. The company, now called Aviron Pictures, later dropped the film. Saban Films later acquired distribution rights to the film. It was to receive its world premiere at FrightFest as part of the Glasgow Film Festival but was replaced at the last minute by Pandemic. The film was released on June 10, 2016, to video on demand, prior to opening in a limited release on July 8, 2016.

Reception
Cell was panned by most critics. On the review aggregator website Rotten Tomatoes, the film has an approval rating of 11% based on 57 reviews and an average score of 3.8/10. The site's critical consensus reads, "Shoddily crafted and devoid of suspense, Cell squanders a capable cast and Stephen King's once-prescient source material on a bland rehash of zombie cliches." On Metacritic, the film has a score of 38 out of 100, based on 15 critics, indicating "generally unfavorable reviews".

Jeannette Catsoulis of The New York Times criticized the film's "bare-bones screenplay" for being "wholly unable to deliver even a smidgen of nuance or depth", and called Cusack's performance "possibly the most detached" of his career. Owen Gleiberman of Variety referred to the outbreak scene in the airport as the "only unsettling scene" in the film, and wrote that "the film is about as close as you could get to a generic low-budget undead thriller". Steve Greene of IndieWire gave the film a grade of "C−", calling it "a character study with a dearth of character", and concluding that the film has "no greater message [...] except that using a Bluetooth headset to call someone from an airport bathroom stall should be punishable by zombification".

Odie Henderson of RogerEbert.com gave the film two-and-a-half stars out of four, commending the performances of Cusack, Jackson, and Keach but criticizing the film's "occasional lack of storytelling clarity", calling it "rushed and unclear in its details about the pulse and its aftermath". Patrick Cooper of Bloody Disgusting called it a "forgettable adaptation" and further stated that "the story packs absolutely no punch and the solid stable of actors look bored for most of the film". Nico Lang of Consequence of Sound wrote that Cell wasted an intriguing premise and called it "unnecessarily glum and grim," as well as "pretty dumb". Bob Grimm of Coachella Valley Independent wrote that the movie "is easily one of the worst adaptations ever of a King story".

References

External links
 
 Cell at Box Office Mojo
 
 
  (rating 1.5/5)

2016 films
2016 horror films
2010s science fiction horror films
2010s thriller films
American science fiction horror films
American science fiction thriller films
Films based on science fiction novels
Films based on works by Stephen King
Films based on American horror novels
Films directed by Tod Williams
Films scored by Marcelo Zarvos
Films shot in Atlanta
Films with screenplays by Stephen King
Saban Entertainment films
Films about mobile phones
American horror television films
2010s English-language films
2010s American films